Sir Geoffrey Summers, 1st Baronet, CBE, DL, JP, CStJ (2 September 1891 – 17 January 1972) was a British businessman.

Educated at Uppingham and Gonville and Caius College, Cambridge, Summers served in the First World War with the Royal Engineers (Territorial Force). He joined John Summers & Sons Ltd, steel manufacturers of Shotton, in 1913, and became a director in 1921.

He was High Sheriff of Flintshire for 1939. In 1952 he was created a baronet, of Shotton in the County of Flint.

References

1891 births
1972 deaths
Baronets in the Baronetage of the United Kingdom
High Sheriffs of Flintshire
Commanders of the Order of the British Empire
Royal Engineers officers
British Army personnel of World War I